The Nordic Futsal Cup is the Nordic countries futsal Championship competition hosted by UEFA.

History 
The Nordic Futsal Cup had its inauguration edition in 2013 in the Danish city of Nykøbing Falster. Denmark, Finland, Norway and Sweden participated. In 2016, Greenland made its debut in the tournament.

Summary

Medal table

General statistics

References 

 
International futsal competitions
Futsal competitions in Europe
2013 establishments in Europe
Recurring sporting events established in 2013
Inter-Nordic sports competitions